Fool The Detector is an EP by breakcore artist Venetian Snares.

Track listing
 "Ego D.S.P." – 4:41
 "Fool The Detector" – 4:54 
 "Chriohn" – 5:54
 "Index Pavilion" – 4:04

External links
 DISCOGS page

2012 EPs
Venetian Snares albums